The Rock Cup is Gibraltar's premier cup football competition, and is organised annually by the Gibraltar Football Association (GFA).

From 1894/95 Gibraltar's Cup Competition was known as "The Senior Merchant's Cup". In 1935 a new trophy was presented, to the Gibraltar Football Association by the Merchants, Traders and Hotels of Gibraltar and thus the Rock Cup, as it is known today, was born. 

The winner of the 2014 Rock Cup was to be the first one to participate in the Europa League, but as Lincoln Red Imps had already been titled league champion, thus qualifying for 2014–15 UEFA Champions League, the losing finalist College Europa qualified for the first qualifying round. 

Due to a sponsorship with Gibtelecom, the cup was known as the Gibtelecom Rock Cup from 2018 to 2021.

Format
The Rock Cup is open to all Gibraltar Football Association club members and is played on a straight knock out basis. 

In 2014 UEFA president Michel Platini presented the trophy to the winners.

List of winners

1894-95 - 1935: The Senior Merchant's Cup

1894–95 Gibraltar
1896-97 Jubilee
1897-98 Jubilee
1898-99 Albion
1899-1900 Exiles
1900-01 Prince of Wales F.C.
1901-02 Exiles
1902-03 Prince of Wales F.C.
1903-04 Prince of Wales F.C.
1904-05 Athletic
1905-06 Prince of Wales F.C.
1907 til 1933 not played'
1933-34 Electricity Department Football Team
1934-35 not played1935 Onwards - The Rock Cup:

1935–36 HMS Hood1936–37 Britannia XI
1937–38 Britannia XI
1938–39 2nd Battalion The King's Regiment
1939–40 Europa
1940–41 Not held1941–42 Anti-Aircraft Section, Royal Artillery
1942–43 Royal Air Force New Camp
1943–44 4th Battalion Royal Scott
1945–46 Europa
1946–47 Gibraltar United
1947–48 Britannia XI
1948–49 Prince of Wales F.C.
1949–50 Europa
1950–51 Europa
1951–52 Europa
1953–54 Gibraltar United
1954–55 Britannia XI
1955–56 Europa
1956–57 Britannia XI
1957–58 Europa
1958–59 Gibraltar United
1959–60 Prince of Wales F.C.
1960–61 Europa
1961–62 Britannia XI
1962–63 Gibraltar United
1963–64 Gibraltar United
1964–65 Gibraltar United
1965–66 Gibraltar United
1966–73 Not Held
1973–74 Manchester United Reserve
1974–75 Glacis United
1975–76 2nd Battalion Royal Green Jackets
1976–77 Manchester United
1977–78 Not Held
1978–79 St Jago's
1979–80 Manchester United
1980–81 Glacis United
1981–82 Glacis United
1982–83 St Joseph's
1983–84 St Joseph's
1984–85 St Joseph's
1985–86 Lincoln
1986–87 St Joseph's
1987–88 Royal Air Force Gibraltar
1988–89 Lincoln Reliance
1989–90 Lincoln
1990–91 Not Held
1991–92 St Joseph's
1992–93 Lincoln
1993–94 Lincoln
1994–95 St Theresa's
1995–96 St Joseph's
1996–97 Manchester 62
1997–98 Glacis United
1998–99 Gibraltar United
1999–2000 Gibraltar United
2000–01 Gibraltar United
2001–02 Lincoln
2002–03 Manchester 62
2003–04 Lincoln
2004–05 Lincoln
2005–06 Lincoln
2006–07 Lincoln
2007–08 Lincoln
2008–09 Lincoln
2009–10 Lincoln
2010–11 Lincoln
2011–12 St Joseph's
2013 St Joseph's
2014 Lincoln
2015 Lincoln
2016 Lincoln
2017 Europa
2017–18 Europa
2019 Europa
2020 Abandoned due to COVID-19 pandemic''
2021 Lincoln
2021–22 Lincoln

Performance by club

References

External links
Gibraltar Football Association
Cup at soccerway.com

 
National association football cups
Cup
1895 establishments in Gibraltar
Recurring sporting events established in 1895